The Hudson Bay Post is a monthly newspaper. It is the only newspaper in Churchill, Manitoba. It is available in Churchill, Thompson, and Winnipeg.

References

Monthly newspapers
Churchill, Manitoba
Newspapers published in Manitoba
Newspapers published in Winnipeg